George Wyndham Kennion, DD (5 September 184519 May 1922), was the Anglican Bishop of Adelaide, and later Bishop of Bath and Wells.

Birth and education
George Wyndham Kennion, the son of George Kennion and Catherine, daughter of J.F. Fordyce, was born at Harrogate, England, on 5 September 1845. He was educated at Eton College and Oriel College, Oxford, where he graduated B.A. in 1867 and M.A. in 1871.

Priesthood
He was ordained deacon in 1869 and priest in 1870. He was an inspector of schools 1871–3, vicar of St Paul, Hull, in 1873, and of All Saints, Bradford, in 1876.

Bishop of Adelaide
In 1882 he was chosen by Archbishop Tait to be the second bishop of Adelaide; and was consecrated a bishop by John Jackson, Bishop of London, at Westminster Abbey on 30 November 1882. On 5 December he married Henrietta, daughter of Sir Charles Dalrymple Fergusson.

Kennion arrived in South Australia early in 1883 and soon realised that more churches were needed in the rapidly growing suburbs of Adelaide and in outlying country districts. He set to work to fill this need and personally visited all the centres in the colony. During his 12 years in the diocese many churches were built, considerable progress was made in the building of the cathedral, and the number of clergy increased from 50 to 75.

Bishop of Bath and Wells
In 1894 Archibald Primrose, 5th Earl of Rosebery called him to the bishopric of Bath and Wells. He was translated (legally taking up his new See) by the confirmation of his election on 17 October 1894 at St Mary-le-Bow. There he found no lack of work and ruled the diocese with tact and wisdom. He had some difficulties with the extreme high church movement in the church, but though he allowed much liberty there were limits he would not allow to be passed. He had in early life been associated with the evangelicals, but became a moderate high churchman. He did not take a leading part in ecclesiastical affairs, but was an excellent chairman of the English committee on faith and order.

He was lecturer in pastoral theology at Cambridge University in 1899 and Ramsden preacher in 1901. In June 1901, he received an honorary doctorate in Divinity from the University of Glasgow.

During the First World War, Kennion was not among the leading bishops preaching condemnation of Germany. He tended to encourage practical initiatives in his diocese, supporting recruitment of clergy to the Chaplaincies, naming clerical families and describing their activities in the War including recognition of individual gallantry awards, and promoting women volunteers to work in agriculture.  He pressed his clergy to support wounded soldiers and sailors, using a 200-year-old adage.

‘God and soldiers men adore 

In time of war, but not before: 

When peace returns, and things are righted, 

God is forgot, and soldiers slighted.’ 

‘Let it not happen here’, Kennion added, but in the 1920s and 1930s it did happen.

Death
Kennion had a serious illness at the end of 1917 and resigned his See effective 1 August 1919. He died at Ayr on 19 May 1922.

Private life
Kennion was a Freemason, under the jurisdiction of the United Grand Lodge of England (UGLE). Although he never served in the prestigious role of Grand Chaplain of UGLE, in 1897 he was granted the honorific rank of Past Grand Chaplain in recognition of his services to English Freemasonry, as part of a series of similar honorary promotions intended to mark the diamond jubilee of Queen Victoria.

Kennion was also noted as a cyclist. ‘In later years he was accredited with having been the first English bishop to become a cyclist’.

Publications
  (The first edition was 1853. The ISBN refers to a 21st-century reprint)

References

External links

 J. R. Warner, 'Kennion, George Wyndham (1845 - 1922)', Australian Dictionary of Biography, Volume 5, Melbourne University Press, 1974, p. 17.

1845 births
1922 deaths
People from Harrogate
People educated at Eton College
Alumni of Oriel College, Oxford
Anglican bishops of Adelaide
Bishops of Bath and Wells
19th-century Anglican bishops in Australia
20th-century Church of England bishops